The 2001 ELMS at Most was the fifth round of the 2001 European Le Mans Series season.  It took place at Autodrom Most, Czech Republic, on August 5, 2001.

Official results

Class winners in bold.

† - Car #61 was disqualified for aggressive driving and avoidable contact with another car.

Statistics
 Pole Position - #7 Johansson Motorsport - 1:18.110
 Fastest Lap - #7 Johansson Motorsport - 1:21.025
 Distance - 485.316 km
 Average Speed - 175.538 km/h

External links
 Official Results
 World Sports Racing Prototypes - Race Results

Most
European Le Mans Series Most